Quizon is a Filipino surname. Notable people with this surname include:

 Epy Quizon (born 1973), Filipino actor and TV host
 Eric Quizon, Filipino actor, director, producer, writer, and comedian
 Freddie Quizon (1956–2005)
 Rodolfo Vera Quizon Sr. (1928–2012), Filipino actor and comedian, better known by his stage name Dolphy
 Salvador Q. Quizon
 Vandolph Quizon, Filipino actor and comedian
 Zia Quizon, Filipino singer-songwriter and recording artist
 Gelyn Quizon Smart & Beauty with a Matured Personality